"Original Sin" is a song by Australian rock group INXS, released as the first single from the band's fourth album, The Swing. It was written by Michael Hutchence and Andrew Farriss, and produced by Nile Rodgers.

Released as a single in December 1983, it became the group's first single to reach the Australian top 10, reaching No. 1 in early 1984; it was the group's only No. 1 hit in Australia. The song also reached No. 20 in Canada and No. 58 in the US.

Composition
Pengilly said, "Michael wrote the lyrics and each time I ask him what they mean I get something different. The main theme of it really is — it's almost a hippy song! — it's about everyone joining together, and it's also about people's desires, and waking up the next morning and finding them washed away."

Details
Daryl Hall sings the chorus with Hutchence. During an interview in Australia, Hall said Nile Rodgers called him and asked him to sing on the song. Rodgers had participated in remixing the single "Adult Education" for Hall & Oates the previous year.

For the music video, two versions exist, both were filmed in Japan and features INXS singing on motorbikes as a fairground is set up and taken down around them. The alternate version (in fact the original one) show an Asian woman appearing at certain moments and its end is different. 

In 2010, INXS rerecorded "Original Sin" with American vocalist Rob Thomas and Cuban female rapper DJ Yalediys as a dance single. It is featured in the 2010 INXS tribute album Original Sin.

Reception
Cash Box said the song "is a politically clever track which dreams of a racially equal and peaceful world, while also working as a tight dance single."

In February 2014, after the Seven Network airing of INXS: Never Tear Us Apart mini-series, "Original Sin" charted again in Australia via download sales. It peaked at no. 61 on the ARIA Singles Chart.

In January 2018, as part of Triple M's "Ozzest 100", the 'most Australian' songs of all time, "Original Sin" was ranked number 58.

Track listing
7" single Track listing

12"/CD Maxi single Track listing

Chart performance

Weekly charts

1Kash vs. INXS – Dream on Black Girl (Original Sin)

Year-end charts

See also
List of number-one singles in Australia during the 1980s
List of number-one dance singles of 2011 (U.S.)

References

1983 songs
1984 singles
INXS songs
Number-one singles in Australia
Number-one singles in France
Song recordings produced by Nile Rodgers
Songs written by Andrew Farriss
Songs written by Michael Hutchence
Warner Music Group singles
Songs against racism and xenophobia